The Flowers River caldera complex is a caldera complex, located in eastern Labrador, Canada. The complex is made up of pyroclastic flow tuffs.

See also
Volcanism of Canada
Volcanism of Eastern Canada
List of volcanoes in Canada

References

Labrador
Calderas of Newfoundland and Labrador